Mizoram has an extensive highway network of 927 km with a road density of 43.97 km.

State Highways
Some of the State Highways as per PWD of Mizoram.
 Champhai - North Vanlaiphai Road
 Keiṭum - North Vanlaiphai
 Lunglei-Thenzawl road
 Tlabung-Borapansury Road
 Kawlchaw -Tongkolong Rd.
 Aizawl-Mamit-Vanghmun-Kumarghat Rd
 W.Phaileng to Marpara
 Kawnpui to Hortoki road
 Saitual-Phullen-Suangpuilawn Road
 Khawzawl-Sinzawl-Thanlawn Road
 Kawlkulh-Ngopa-Mimbung Road

National Highways
Some of the National Highway like 54 and 154 have been maintained by Mizoram State Government.

References 

Mizoram State Highways
Highways, State in Mizoram, List of
Highways, State in Mizoram, List of